Corinth, Texas may refer to the following places in Texas:
Corinth, Texas, a city in Denton County
Corinth, Henderson County, Texas, a ghost town
Corinth, Jones County, Texas, an unincorporated community
Corinth, Lee County, Texas, an unincorporated community
Corinth, Leon County, Texas, an unincorporated community
Corinth, Marion County, Texas, a ghost town
Corinth, Milam County, Texas, an unincorporated community
Corinth, Montague County, Texas, an unincorporated community
Corinth, Panola County, Texas, an unincorporated community
Corinth, Van Zandt County, Texas, a ghost town
Second Corinth, Texas